Wan'an Bridge may refer to the following bridges in China:

Wan'an Bridge (Pingnan), a wooden arch bridge in Pingnan County, Ningde, Fujian Province
Luoyang Bridge, also known as Wan'an Bridge, in Quanzhou, Fujian Province
Wan'an Bridge (Shanghai), a stone arch bridge in Jinze, Qingpu District, Shanghai